Puchkirchen am Trattberg is a municipality in the district of Vöcklabruck in Upper Austria, Austria.

References

Cities and towns in Vöcklabruck District